Douglas Joseph Widell (born September 23, 1966) is a former guard who played 9 seasons in the National Football League. He was a part of the Denver Broncos Super Bowl XXIV losing team. His brother Dave Widell was his teammate at Boston College and with the Broncos.

References

1966 births
Living people
American football offensive guards
Boston College Eagles football players
Denver Broncos players
Green Bay Packers players
Detroit Lions players
Indianapolis Colts players